King's Park Secondary School, on Fetlar Drive, in the King's Park area (or specifically in the Simshill area) of south Glasgow, is a Scottish non-denominational state school. It was established in 1962.

Head Teachers

John Bell
David Baillie
Margaret Barr 2007—2012
Tom Feasby (acting) 2012–2012
Kirsty Ayed 2012–2019
Pauline Carr (acting) - 2019–2019
Kirsty Ayed - 2019–present

Former pupils
 Gerry Cinnamon, singer-songwriter
 Willie Donachie, footballer
 Rory Hughes, rugby player
 Ross Irwin, footballer
 Bobby Gillespie, musician
 Alan McGee, businessman
 Jane McCarry, actress
Karen Logan, singer
 James Harkness, actor
 Leslie Hills, film producer
 Louise Rutkowski, singer songwriter & vocal coach
 Gordon Brown, author

References

Secondary schools in Glasgow
Educational institutions established in 1962
1962 establishments in Scotland